Sassaby may refer to:

 Topi
 Common tsessebe

Animal common name disambiguation pages